Joura may refer to:

Places
 Jaura, Gujrat, Pakistan
 Jaura Kalan, Khushab district, Punjab, Pakistan
 Jaura Sian, Punjab, Pakistan
 Jaura Singha, Gurdaspur district, Punjab, India
 Jaura, Madhya Pradesh, India

Other uses
 Saleem Sarwar Jaura, Pakistani politician